Rocquigny is a commune in the Pas-de-Calais department in the Hauts-de-France region of France.

Geography
The A2 autoroute passes by some half-mile distant.

Population

Places of interest
 The church of Notre-Dame, rebuilt along with the rest of the village, after the First World War. It is a listed monument since 2001. The steeple, that was in a state of collapse due to faulty concrete, was restored between 2003 and 2013.

See also
Communes of the Pas-de-Calais department

References

Communes of Pas-de-Calais